Urroz may refer to:

People
 Alberto Urroz (born 1970), Spanish pianist
 Eduardo Urroz (born 1967), Nicaraguan football player
 Eloy Urroz (born 1967), Mexican writer
 Francisco Urroz (footballer) (1920–1992), Chilean football player
 Manuela Urroz (born 1991), Chilean field hockey player

Places
 Urroz, Navarre, Spain